Muhammad Tulus, who goes by the stage name Tulus, is an Indonesian singer-songwriter. Gajah remained in the top 10 best selling albums of iTunes Asia for two consecutive months. In addition, the album was listed among the top 9 Indonesian albums by Tempo magazine.

In October 2014, Tulus performed at the 2014 Anugerah Planet Muzik in Singapore. The event was broadcast live in Malaysia and Indonesia. Tulus was named "Best New Artist (Male)" at the 2014 Anugerah Planet Muzik. In 2016, Tulus returning earning two nominations, including APM Most Popular Artist at the 2016 Anugerah Planet Muzik.

In September 2015, Tulus received nine nominations and won six awards, including "Best of the Best Album", "Best Pop Album", and "Best Pop Male Solo Artist" at the 2015 Anugerah Musik Indonesia.

Anugerah Musik Indonesia
The Anugerah Musik Indonesia (English translation: Indonesian Music Awards), is an annual Indonesian major music award. They have been compared to the American Grammy Awards and British Brit Awards. It is the highest music award given to outstanding artists in Indonesia. Tulus has received thirteen awards from 22 nominations.

!
|-
| 2012
| "Teman Pesta"
| Best Alternative Production Work
| 
|
|-
| 2014
| "Kita Bisa" (feat. RAN)
| Best R&B/Soul Production Work
| 
|
|-
| rowspan= "9" | 2015
| rowspan= "3" | "Jangan Cintai Aku Apa Adanya"
| Best Pop Male Solo Artist
| 
| rowspan= "9" |
|-
| Best of the Best Production Work
| 
|-
| rowspan= "2" | Best Pop Songwriter
| 
|-
| rowspan= "2" | "Gajah"
| 
|-
| Best Pop Recording Producer
| 
|-
| rowspan= "2" | Gajah
| Best Pop Album
| 
|-
| Best of the Best Album
| 
|-
| "Baru"
| Best R&B/Soul Male/Female Solo Artist
| 
|-
| "1000 Tahun Lamanya"
| Best Mix Engineer
| 
|-
| rowspan= "5" | 2016
| rowspan= "4" | "Pamit"
| Best Pop Male Solo Artist
| 
| rowspan= "5" |
|-
| Best Pop Songwriter
| 
|-
| Best Pop Recording Producer
| 
|-
| Best of the Best Production Work
| 
|-
| "Para Pemenang" (feat. RAN)
| Best Soul/R&B/Urban Group/Collaboration
| 
|-
| rowspan= "6" | 2017
| rowspan= "3" | "Monokrom"
| Best Soul/R&B/Urban Male/Female Solo Artist
| 
| rowspan= "7" | 

|-
| Best of the Best Production Work
| 
|-
| Best Mix Engineer
| 
|-
| rowspan= "3" | Monokrom
| Best Soul/R&B/Urban Album
| 
|-
| Best of the Best Album
| 
|-
| Best Recording Album Producer
| 
|-
|rowspan= "4" |2019
|Labirin
| Best Urban Pop Solo Artist 
|  
|-
|rowspan= "3" | Adu Rayu (feat. Glenn Fredly
| Best of The Best Production Work
| 
|-
| Best Collaboration 
|  
|-
| Best Songwriter 
|
|-
| 2020
| Adaptasi
| Best Pop Male Solo Artist 
|  
|-
| rowspan= "8" |2022
| rowspan= "2" |Manusia
| Best of The Best Album
|  
|-
| Best Pop Album 
| 
|-
| rowspan= "5" |Hati-hati di Jalan
| Best of The Best Production Work
|  
|-
| Best Pop Song
| 
|-
| Best Pop Male Solo Artist 
| 
|-
| Best Pop Songwriter
|  
|-
| Best Music Video
| 
|-
|Diri
| Best Folk/Country Song
| 
|-

Anugerah Planet Muzik
The Anugerah Planet Muzik (English translation: Planet Music Awards) was an annual award given to the most popular artists from Indonesia, Singapore, and Malaysia. Tulus has received two awards from 10 nominations.

!
|-
| rowspan= "2" | 2014
| rowspan= "2" | "Jangan Cintai Aku Apa Adanya"
| Best New Artist (Male)
| 
| rowspan= "2" |
|-
| Best Song (Indonesia)
| 
|-
| rowspan= "3" | 2015
| "Jangan Coba Berlari" (Written and composed by Tulus)
| Best Collaboration (Song)
| 
| rowspan= "3" |
|-
| "Satu Hari di Bulan Juni"
| APM Most Popular Song
| 
|-
| rowspan= "2" | Tulus
| rowspan= "2" | APM Most Popular Artist
| 
|-
| rowspan= "3" | 2016
| 
| rowspan= "3" | 
|-
| rowspan= "2" | "Pamit"
| APM Most Popular Song
| 
|-
| rowspan= "2" | Best Song (Indonesia)
| 
|-
| rowspan= "2" | 2017
| rowspan= "2" | "Monokrom"
| 
| rowspan= "2" |
|-
| Best Artist (Male)
| 
|-

Ardan Group Awards
The Ardan Group Awards are an awards were presented by Ardan Group, to honour for musician who has the highest airplay in a year in four radio namely, Ardan Radio, Radio B, Radio Cakra and Solo Radio. Tulus has received one award.

!
|-
| 2013
| Tulus (4745 times play in a year)
| Most Widely Played Song
| 
| 
|-

Cornetto Pop Awards
The Cornetto Pop Awards are an annual awards were presented by brand Cornetto, to honour for talent musician in achievement music work. Tulus has received two awards.

!
|-
| rowspan= "2" | 2017
| Tulus
| Favorite Pop Male Singer
| 
| rowspan= "2" |
|-
| "Manusia Kuat"
| Best Pop Music Video
| 
|-

Dahsyatnya Awards
Presented on 2009, the Dahsyatnya Awards are annual awards presented by the daily Indonesian TV show Dahsyat that airs on RCTI, to be awarded for talent artists who become outstanding (Indonesian: Terdahsyat) in music and entertainment. Tulus has received seven awards from 18 nominations.

!
|-
| rowspan= "4" | 2015
| "Gajah"
| Outstanding Song
| 
| rowspan= "4" |
|-
| rowspan= "2" | "Baru"
| Outstanding Video Clip
| 
|-
| Outstanding Video Clip Director
| 
|-
| rowspan= "2" | Tulus
| rowspan= "2" | Outstanding Male Solo Singer
| 
|-
| rowspan= "4" | 2016
| 
| rowspan= "4" |
|-
| rowspan= "3" | "Jangan Cintai Aku Apa Adanya"
| Outstanding Video Clip
| 
|-
| Outstanding Model Video Clip
| 
|-
| rowspan= "2" | Outstanding Video Clip Director
| 
|-
| rowspan= "6" | 2017
| "Ruang Sendiri"
| 
| rowspan= "6" |
|-
| Tulus
| Outstanding Male Solo Singer
| 
|-
| rowspan= "2" | "Pamit"
| Outstanding Song
| 
|-
| rowspan= "2" | Outstanding Video Clip
| 
|-
| rowspan= "3" | "Monokrom"
| 
|-
| Outstanding Video Clip Director
| 
|-
| rowspan= "4" | 2018
| Outstanding Song
| 
| rowspan= "4" |
|-
| Tulus
| Outstanding Male Solo Singer
| 
|-
| "Tukar Jiwa"
| rowspan= "2" | Outstanding Video Clip
| 
|-
| "Manusia Kuat"
| 
|-

Global Seru Awards
The Global Seru Awards are awarded to celebrities who have caught the attention of the public through interesting or exciting accomplishments.

!
|-
| 2015
| Tulus
| Most Exciting Hit
| 
|
|-

Hai Reader's Poll Music Awards
The Hai Reader's Poll Music Awards are an online awards to honour for talent artist in music. The awards show presented by Indonesian magazine Hai and using online voting. Tulus has received four awards from 6 nominations.

!
|-
| rowspan= "4" | 2014
| Gajah
| The Best Album
| 
| rowspan= "4" |
|-
| "Sepatu"
| The Best Single
| 
|-
| rowspan= "3" | Tulus
| The Best Pop
| 
|-
| rowspan= "2" | The Best Male
| 
|-
| rowspan= "2" | 2015
| 
| rowspan= "2" |
|-
| Konser Gajah
| The Best Concert
| 
|-

Indonesian Choice Awards
The Indonesian Choice Awards are an annual entertainment awards were presented by NET. since established in 2014, for honour for artists who had reached achievement in music, entertainment and movie. Tulus has received five awards from 9 nominations.

!
|-
| rowspan= "3" | 2014
| Gajah
| Album of the Year
| 
| rowspan= "3" |
|-
| "Sepatu"
| Song of the Year
| 
|-
| rowspan= "3" | Tulus
| rowspan= "3" | Male Singer of the Year
| 
|-
| 2016
| 
|
|-
| rowspan= "4" | 2017
| 
| rowspan= "4" |
|-
| Monokrom
| Album of the Year
| 
|-
| "Ruang Sendiri"
| Song of the Year
| 
|-
| "Monokrom"
| rowspan= "2" | Music Video of the Year
| 
|-
| 2018
| "Manusia Kuat"
| 
| rowspan= "4" |

JawaPos.com Readers Choice Awards
The JawaPos.com Readers Choice Awards was an online awards have first established in 2017 by newspaper Jawa Pos, to honour for public figure in music, film and entertainment. Tulus has received one award.

!
|-
| 2017
| Tulus
| Favorite Male Singer
| 
| 
|-

Maya Awards
The Maya Awards (Indonesian translation: Piala Maya), is an annual Indonesian film award initiated in 2012 by Indonesian online film enthusiasts, that is initiated by @FILM_Indonesia Twitter account. Nominations and awards are given to each year's best local productions. Tulus has received two awards from 3 nominations.

!
|-
| 2014
| "Lekas" (for film 3 Nafas Likas)
| Best Theme Song
| 
|
|-
| 2016
| "Ruang Sendiri"
| rowspan= "2" | Best Music Video
| 
|
|-
| 2017
| "Manusia Kuat"
| 
|
|-

Mom & Kids Awards
The Mom & Kids Awards were established in 2015 by MNCTV to honour for talent artist in music and entertainment, as inspiration for mother and kids.

!
|-
| 2015
| rowspan= "2" | Tulus
| Favorite Male Singer
| 
|
|-
| 2016
| Favorite Idol Singer
| 
|
|-

Nickelodeon Indonesia Kids Choice Awards
The Nickelodeon Indonesia Kids' Choice Awards is the Indonesian version of Nickelodeon Kids' Choice Awards, held since 2008 in Jakarta. Tulus has received one award from 3 nominations.

!
|-
| 2015
| Tulus
| Favorite Singer
| 
|
|-
| 2016
| "Pamit"
| Favorite Indonesian Song
| 
|
|-
| 2017
| Tulus
| Favorite Singer
| 
|
|-

Oz Radio Bandung FM Awards
The Oz Radio Bandung FM Awards are an online radio awards were presented by OZ Radio FM, for talent musician/singer who have listed of 'friendly' in music. Tulus has received two awards from 8 nominations.

!
|-
| rowspan= "4" | 2017
| "Pamit"
| Most Friendly Song
| 
| rowspan= "4" |
|-
| rowspan= "5" | Tulus
| Most Friendly Ozclusive
| 
|-
| Most Friendly Male Singer
| 
|-
| rowspan= "2" | Most Friendly Musician
| 
|-
| rowspan= "4" | 2018
| 
| rowspan= "4" |
|-
| Most Friendly Male Singer
| 
|-
| "Tukar Jiwa"
| Most Friendly Song
| 
|-
| Teman Tulus
| Most Friendly Fanbase
| 
|-

Rolling Stone Editor's Choice Awards
The Rolling Stone Editor's Choice Awards were created by Rolling Stone Indonesia magazine for outstanding contribution to the popularity of works, accomplishments, achievements, influence and popularity in popular culture. Tulus has received one award.

!
|-
| 2013
| Tulus
| Rookie of the Year
| 
|
|-

SCTV Awards
The SCTV Awards are an award ceremony were presenting to artists who had most famous (Indonesian: Paling Ngetop) in entertainment by the Indonesian television station SCTV since 2001.

!
|-
| 2015
| Tulus
| Famous Singer
| 
|
|-

SCTV Music Awards
The SCTV Music Awards is an annual awards for Indonesian musician and held by Indonesian television station, SCTV, since 2003 and also presenting some awards, who the winner selected based on voting public through SMS.

!
|-
| 2015
| rowspan= "3" | Tulus
| rowspan= "3" | Most Famous Male Solo Singer
| 
|
|-
| 2016
| 
|
|-
| 2017
| 
|
|-

Selebrita Awards
The Selebrita Awards are an awards ceremony were presented by infotainment Selebrita since 2013, to awarded for celebrity in entertainment. It's based on voted by fans in Trans 7 website poll.

!
|-
| 2015
| "Gajah"
| rowspan= "2" | Most Celeb Song
| 
|
|-
| 2016
| "Pamit"
| 
|
|-

Honor awards, magazines, newspapers

Hai Magazine

!
|-
| 2015
| Tulus
| Artist of the Year
| 
|
|-

Java Jazz Festival

!
|-
| 2015
| Tulus
| Most Young Talented
| 
|
|-

JOOX Indonesia 
JOOX is a music streaming platform that give you a great experience which include Free Radio, Top Chart, Editors pick, New releases, offline music, and more. Tulus has received one award.

Spotify Indonesia

!
|-
| 2016
| Tulus
| Top Male Artist 2016 (Indonesia)
| 
| 
|-

Tempo Magazine

!
|-
| 2014
| Gajah
| Top 9 Indonesian Music Album
| 
|
|-

References

Lists of awards received by Indonesian musician